is a former Japanese football player.

Club career
Kitano was born in Kanagawa Prefecture on November 20, 1984. He joined the Yokohama F. Marinos youth team in 2003. However he did not play much, and he moved to Vissel Kobe in August 2005. He did not play much there, so he moved to the Japan Football League club YKK AP in 2007. Although he played often, he retired at the end of the 2007 season.

National team career
In September 2001, Kitano was selected Japan U-17 national team for 2001 U-17 World Championship. He played all 3 matches as substitutes.

Club statistics

Honors 
2000 AFC U-17 Championship Top Scorer

References

External links

1984 births
Living people
Association football people from Kanagawa Prefecture
Japanese footballers
Japan youth international footballers
J1 League players
J2 League players
Japan Football League players
Yokohama F. Marinos players
Vissel Kobe players
Kataller Toyama players
Association football forwards